Keijo Huusko (born 5 August 1980 in Kemi) is a Finnish footballer currently playing for the club RoPS.

Career
He previously played for Vaasan Palloseura, BK Häcken, Lyn, Strømsgodset and Tromsø IL. He joined Tromsø on 1 January 2008. After several injuries Huusko decided to move back to Finland and TP-47. He signed a four-year contract with them on 26 February 2010. The striker left TP-47 in February 2010 and signed for PS Kemi Kings.

International career
Huusko has been capped eight times and scored two goals for the Finland national football team.

Coaching career
He also has roles of assistant manager and Director of Football. Huusko was also during his TP career the assistant manager and Director of Football of the Finnish club.

References

1980 births
Living people
Finnish footballers
Finland international footballers
Vaasan Palloseura players
BK Häcken players
Lyn Fotball players
Strømsgodset Toppfotball players
Tromsø IL players
Veikkausliiga players
Eliteserien players
Expatriate footballers in Sweden
Expatriate footballers in Norway
Finnish expatriate sportspeople in Sweden
Finnish expatriate sportspeople in Norway
Finnish expatriate footballers
People from Kemi
Association football midfielders
TP-47 players
Sportspeople from Lapland (Finland)